Bees Saal Pehle is a 1972 Bollywood drama film directed by Probir Roy. The film stars Lalita Pawar.

Cast
 Vinod Mehra
 Sarita Joshi
 Farida Jalal
Lalita Pawar

Music

 "Abhi To Dua Deke Bachpan Gaya Hai" (Asha Bhosle, Kishore Kumar)
 "Geet In Hothon Par Mere Aane Ko To Aa Hi Gaye" (Lata Mangeshkar)
 "Hai Re Yeh Pyaar Ki Majboori Aur Bebasi" (Lata Mangeshkar)
 "Hai Zamaana Mere Dil Pyaar Ka" (Kishore Kumar)
 "Jab Tak Yeh Raat Hai Baaki Teri Meri Baat Hai Baaki" (Ranu Mukherjee)
 "Kehte Hain Saare Hanste Nazaare Khushiyaan Lutaaye Chala Jaa" (Lata Mangeshkar)
 "Kyon Hai Deewaane Tu Akela Kahaan Gaye Tere Saathi" (Ranu Mukherjee)
 "Poochhe To Kaun Poochhe Yeh Baat Aasmaan Se" (Hemant Kumar)

External links
 

1972 films
1970s Hindi-language films
1972 drama films
Films scored by Hemant Kumar
Indian drama films